Simon James Lambert (born 21 February 1989) in Boston, Lincolnshire, England, is a speedway rider in the United Kingdom.

Biography
Lambert rode in the Conference League with Boston Barracudas, twice winning the Conference League Pairs Championship. In 2009 and 2010 he rode for Scunthorpe Scorpions in the Premier League. In 2010 he won the Golden Hammer individual meeting at Monmore Green, with a perfect fifteen-point score.

He signed on for the Sheffield Tigers for the 2011 season on a 3.47 starting average, which rose to 5.63 by the end of the season.

He also rode in the National League in 2011 for Stoke Potters, and with Tim Webster won the National League Pairs Championship in June 2011.

In 2012 he signed for Leicester Lions, but lost his place halfway through the season, returning to ride for Stoke Potters in the National League. In August he returned to the Premier League with Rye House Rockets.

Lambert has been nicknamed 'Rambo' by supporters.

For the 2015 season Simon was picked by his former Premier League Club who have stepped up to the Elite League Leicester Lions as one of their Elite League Draft riders while Simon signed for his local team the Peterborough Panthers in the premier league where he will start the season in one of their reserves berths.

In 2022, he rode for the Scunthorpe Scorpions in the SGB Championship 2022. In 2023, he re-signed for Scunthorpe for the SGB Championship 2023.

References

External links

1989 births
Living people
People from Boston, Lincolnshire
King's Lynn Stars riders
Leicester Lions riders
Scunthorpe Scorpions riders
Sheffield Tigers riders